UFO's and the Men Who Fly Them! is a 1996 Man or Astro-man? 7" EP released jointly by Jezz Thorpe (Drug Racer) and Henry Owings of Chunklet (magazine) on Drug Racer Records. It was released on gray vinyl, anti-freeze green vinyl, red vinyl and black vinyl—with red being the rarest (only 100 pressed). The EP was recorded at Zero Return Studios in Wetumpka, AL.

This single featured a die-cut sleeve that unfolded to reveal a punch-out "flying saucer disc" (assembled in 5 easy steps).  The punch-out and assemble UFO led to many a damaged picture sleeve, making the procurement of a mint copy of this record even more difficult.

Track listing

Drug Side
"9-Volt (Rechargeable Version)"
"The Sound Waves, Reversing"

Racer Side
"Italian Movie Theme"
"High Wire"

References

Man or Astro-man? EPs
1996 EPs